Service Product Management deals with managing a service product across its complete life cycle.  This organizational function is equally common between Business-to-business as well as Business-to-consumer businesses. A service product, unlike a hardware or software product, is intangible and manifests itself as pure professional services or as a combination of services with necessary software and/or hardware. The service product management practice ensures management of a profitable service in the marketplace. Service Product manager identifies profitable service space, packages services in a productized form and delivers the same to the market. The function is a core service business management function and is a mix of sales and marketing functions. The function interfaces with various organizational groups like Strategy, Planning, Financial Controls /Management Accounting, Sales, Marketing Communications etc.

Functions of a Service Product Manager 

According to author Linda Gorchels, the functions of a service product manager are:

 Service Idea Generation/Management - The function deals with capturing market's unmet and/or under-served needs, filtering the ideas based on business viability, business feasibility and potential, scale-ability, company strategy, and capital rate of return considerations. The end result is a potential set of market feasibility and market features captured in a marketing requirement document.
 Service Product Creation - Potentially saleable service features are captured and productized. That means creation of necessary product documentation like executive materials, service product document, technical services document, service scope etc.
 Service Sales Support - Service product management supports service sales by providing accurate resource estimate and in the right mix to provide an efficient product cost base on which to baseline the customer pricing.
 Demand Supply Planning - Services profitability management by supporting balance between service demand and supply of necessary service resources.
 Business Management System Support - Efficient management of service product cost and revenues according to service contract and incurred costs. The same is generally needs a service product manager to provide product data management for Enterprise resource planning systems.
 Marketing and Market Communications - Industry event participation, press release, consensus building, delivering service messaging through various available marketing channels.
 Knowledge Management - Manage the knowledge management process and best practices for the service.
 Service Ramp Down - Manage the decision process of ramping down service product, and executing the service ramp down thus ending the service product management process.

References

Product management